Ninaithathu Yaaro is a 2014 Indian Tamil-language romantic drama film written and directed by Vikraman and produced by Ramesh P Pillai. The project stars debutants Rejith Menon and Nimisha Suresh playing the lead pair with Karthik Yogi, Azhar, Ashvatt, Riythvika & Subiksha. The film began production in 2013 and released on 30 January 2014.

Plot
A director changes the perception of love for a group of youngsters by narrating how he reclaimed his life because of his now-married lover and her understanding husband.

Cast
Arish Kumar as Actor(Cameo)
Rejith Menon as Mohan
Nimisha Suresh as Kavitha
Karthik Yogi as Murthy
Azhar as Saravanan
Ashvatt as Karthik
Riythvika as Thenmozhi
Subiksha as Shamila
Richard Rishi as Arun
Leo Sivadass

Special appearances by actors and directors as themselves throughout the film (in alphabetical order) by

Production
After the failure of Mariyadhai (2009), Vikraman took a sabbatical before launching a project titled Ilamai Naatkal in 2011. The film was however shelved after the producers ran into financial problems and is unlikely to release. He then chose to announce his return in October 2012 with a film titled Ninaithathu Yaaro . Newcomer producer Ramesh P Pillai was introduced to the director by a common friend and wanted him to direct their first venture after being impressed by his previous high-profile work. Vikraman revealed that the film would take a step away from his standard themes of family sentiment and the film would be based primarily on youngsters and love. Vikraman chose a fresh cast by advertising auditions on social media and thus then picked his lead actor Rejith Menon, who had appeared in a few Malayalam films, and Nimisha Suresh, a Bangalore-based IT professional who had appeared in other regional films. Keyboard player X. Paulraj was signed on to make his debut as music composer and produced seven songs for the film which were released in July 2013. The team shot scenes in Kashmir and also shot two songs there in picturesque locations in Pahalgam, becoming the first film Tamil unit after a decade to film portions there. Iniya, Monica and Ameer play guest appearances in the film as themselves.

The film was completed but struggled to get a release until Studio 9 agreed to distribute the film and promised at least 100 screens in Tamil Nadu.

Soundtrack

Music was composed by X.Paulraj and Released on Junglee Music.

Critical reception
The Times of India wrote "what should have been an emotional romantic drama that reaffirms our faith in love plays out as a dated film with amateurish performances, unsophisticated filmmaking and needless moralizing". Behindwoods wrote "The narration belongs to a different period with the film travelling on a very flat terrain uniformly, There is no resistance or conflict". Baradwaj Rangan of the Hindu wrote "What's left of this tale is undone by simplistic storytelling, an earnest, overemphatic style, and some ugly moralising".

References

External links
 

Films shot in Jammu and Kashmir
2014 romantic drama films
2014 films
Films shot in Karnataka
2010s Tamil-language films
Films directed by Vikraman
Indian romantic drama films